Marley Zane Marshall-Miranda (born 22 October 2002) is an English professional footballer who plays as a midfielder for  club Colchester United.

Marshall-Miranda joined Colchester United in 2019. He had a loan spell at Worthing during the 2019–20 season, before making his professional debut in September 2020.

Career
Marshall-Miranda joined Colchester United from Brighton & Hove Albion in 2019. He had appeared for Brighton's under-18 side during the 2018–19 Under-18 Premier League season.

After joining Colchester, Marshall-Miranda was sent out on loan to Isthmian League Premier Division side Worthing in December 2019. His loan was extended for a further month in January 2020, before being recalled on 30 January. He scored one goal in six appearances for the club.

Marshall-Miranda made his professional debut for Colchester on 5 September 2020, coming on as a second-half substitute for Ben Stevenson in a 3–1 EFL Cup defeat to Reading.

On 21 December 2020, Marshall-Miranda signed a new contract to keep him with Colchester until summer 2023.

Career statistics

References

External links
Profile at the Colchester United F.C. website

2002 births
Living people
English footballers
Association football midfielders
Brighton & Hove Albion F.C. players
Worthing F.C. players
Colchester United F.C. players
English Football League players
Footballers from Madrid